Lexington Medical Center is a medical complex in Lexington, SC. Lexington Medical Center is owned by Lexington County Health Service District, Inc, a private company. The network includes six community medical centers, an occupational health facility, the largest nursing home in the Carolinas, an Alzheimer's disease care center and seventy physician practices in a variety of services. Lexington Medical Center's main campus is located on Sunset Boulevard in West Columbia.

Cardiovascular care 

A Duke Medicine affiliate, Lexington Medical Center began its complete cardiac care program in 2012. To date, the hospital has performed more than 600 open heart surgeries.

Lexington Medical Center has also earned full chest pain accreditation with percutaneous coronary intervention (PCI) from the Society of Cardiovascular Patient Care (SCPC).

In 2014, Lexington Medical Center began to offer transcatheter aortic valve replacement, known as TAVR. This cardiovascular technology allows doctors to replace the aortic valve with a catheter procedure instead of open heart surgery. Currently, TAVR is for patients with severe aortic stenosis who are high-risk candidates for open heart surgery because of their age, history of heart disease, or other health issues. Patients with severe aortic stenosis have a narrowed aortic valve that does not allow blood to flow efficiently. As the heart works harder to pump enough blood through the smaller opening in the valve, the heart eventually becomes weak. Over time, that can lead to life-threatening heart problems. Lexington Medical Center performed the first fully percutaneous TAVR procedure in South Carolina. With this minimally invasive technique, doctors deployed the new aortic valve through just a small puncture in the femoral artery in the leg.

Additionally, Lexington Medical Center now offers non-surgical closure for holes in the heart called atrial septal defects (ASDs) and patent foramen ovale (PFO). Like TAVR, this minimally invasive procedure eliminates the need for open heart surgery, resulting in shorter hospital stays and faster recovery.

Lexington Medical Center has developed an advanced electrophysiology program to diagnose and treat patients with cardiac arrhythmias. In addition, the program has an experienced team of cardiologists that implant cardiac devices including pacemakers, defibrillators, and biventricular pacing systems. Lexington Medical Center has also begun to use insertable cardiac monitors, commonly known as loop recorders, to diagnose heart rhythm problems.

Lexington Medical Center has physician practices for people with cardiovascular disease: Lexington Cardiology, Lexington Cardiovascular Surgery and Sumter Cardiology.

Surgery 
Lexington Medical Center performs more surgeries than any other hospital in the Midlands of South Carolina. In fiscal year 2013, the hospital performed 21,796 surgeries in more than 30 operating rooms on the hospital's main campus and community medical centers located around Lexington County, South Carolina.

Lexington Medical Center is a Bariatric Surgery Center of Excellence.

Cancer 

Lexington Medical Center's cancer program is affiliated with the Duke Cancer Institute.

The Cancer Services program participates in clinical research. And, the affiliation with Duke provides patients with access to Duke's cancer care, research and education.

Lexington Medical Center offers a lung cancer screening program. The radiation medicine department has a TrueBeam linear accelerator and stereotactic radiation capabilities. The cancer program also has three nurse navigators, research nurses, social workers and quality of life programs including art classes and support groups.

Lexington Medical Center diagnoses approximately 250 breast cancer patients each year. The hospital's breast program has accreditation from the National Accreditation Program for Breast Centers (NAPBC) and the American College of Radiology (ACR). Lexington Medical Center has four Women's Imaging centers and a mobile mammography van, all offering digital mammography.

Physician network 

Lexington Medical Center employs more than 275 doctors in 58 physician practices around the Midlands. Representing a wide variety of specialties, these doctors are among the health care providers in the Southeast. In fiscal year 2013, they logged nearly 857,000 patient visits.

Lexington Medical Center was the first hospital in the Midlands to perform single-incision laparoscopic surgery. The hospital was the first in South Carolina to perform microwave ablation for tumors and single-incision hysterectomy. It was also among the first hospitals in the nation to perform minimally invasive endovascular surgery that repairs aortic aneurysms with a catheter.

Lexington Medical Center Physician Network Specialties:
Anesthesiology,
Cardiology,
Cardiovascular Surgery,
Emergency Medicine,
Endocrinology,
ENT & Allergy,
Family Practice,
General Surgery,
Hospitalists,
Infectious Disease,
Internal Medicine,
Neurology,
OB/GYN,
Occupational Health,
Oncology,
Orthopaedics,
Pain Management,
Pediatrics,
Plastic Surgery,
Psychiatry,
Pulmonology,
Radiation Oncology,
Radiology,
Rheumatology
Urgent Care and
Urologic Surgery

Emergency care 
Lexington Medical Center operates the second busiest Emergency Room in South Carolina, behind Spartanburg Regional Medical Center. It treats more than 105,000 patients each year.

Lexington Medical Center is a Primary Stroke Center.

Women's services 
Lexington Medical Center delivers more than 4,000 babies each year. Readers of The State newspaper voted it as the "Best Place to Have A Baby" in 2014. Lexington Medical Center delivers more babies than any other hospital in the state, except for Greenville Health System.

Urgent care 
Lexington Medical Center's network of care includes six community medical centers around Lexington County in Batesburg-Leesville, Chapin, Gilbert, Irmo, Lexington and Swansea. In fiscal year 2013, there were more than 133,000 patient visits to urgent care facilities. Urgent care physicians address acute, non-life-threatening illnesses and injuries.

Long-term care 
Lexington Medical Center Extended Care, its long-term care and rehabilitation facility, is the largest nursing home in Carolinas. LMC Extended Care includes Carroll Campbell Place, a facility for people with Alzheimer's disease.

Environmental 
Lexington Medical Center received the Leadership in Energy and Environmental Design (LEED) silver certification from the Green Building Council for its Lexington Medical Park 2. The building was the first health care building in South Carolina to receive that distinction.

In 2014, Lexington Medical Center opened Lexington Medical Park Otarre Pointe, a medical facility in Cayce, South Carolina that offers family medicine, occupational health, PT and OT services.

Hospital rating data 
The HealthGrades website contains the clinical quality data for Lexington Medical Center, as of 2017. For this rating section, three different types of data from HealthGrades are presented: clinical quality ratings for twenty-six inpatient conditions and procedures, thirteen patient safety indicators and the percentage of patients giving the hospital as a 9 or 10 (the two highest possible ratings).

For inpatient conditions and procedures, there are three possible ratings: worse than expected, as expected, better than expected.  For this hospital, the data for this category is:
Worse than expected - 6
As expected - 20
Better than expected - 0
For patient safety indicators, there are the same three possible ratings. For this hospital safety indicators were rated as:
Worse than expected - 0
As expected - 10
Better than expected - 3
Percentage of patients rating this hospital as a 9 or 10 - 76%
Percentage of patients who on average rank hospitals as a 9 or 10 - 69%

References 

Hospital buildings completed in 1971
Hospitals in South Carolina
Non-profit organizations based in South Carolina
Buildings and structures in Lexington County, South Carolina